Halloween is the third public album by the group Two Steps from Hell, released in September 2012. The album contains 48 tracks, written by composers Thomas J. Bergersen and Nick Phoenix. All the tracks, apart from To Die on Halloween, are from prior demonstration albums previously only available to the industry. This is their first public album to feature tracks with English vocals.

It was Two Step from Hell's first themed album, which they described as "spooky music... the ultimate Halloween party soundtrack.", and others as "paying homage to the horror genre". However, the group did not consider it one of their "major" releases; their next, SkyWorld, was released just a month later.

Track listing
Tracks 9 and 27 are reworked versions from their original releases.

An official music video was released on YouTube as a preview for the track To Die on Halloween on 28 August 2012.

"Cemetery Waltz" was included in Town & Country's 2021 list of "The 40 Best Halloween Songs Of All Time".

Critical reception
IFMCA-associated reviews website, MundoBSO, rated it six out of ten stars.

Use in media
Two Steps From Hell's music has been used frequently in movie trailers and commercials. 
Ashes was used in the "Rise of the Rakghouls" trailer for Star Wars: The Old Republic.
Calamity was used in the Killzone 3 Justice Trailer.
Hunter's Moon was used in the trailer for Beowulf.
Black Assassin was used in a trailer for Assassin's Creed IV: Black Flag.
Welcome to Widow Woods was used in an episode of The Men Who Built America.
Deck the Halls with Blood was used in the Amnesia mod "Tenebris Lake."

References

2012 albums
Two Steps from Hell albums